Serhiy Mykolayovych Snytko (born 31 March 1975, Kerch, Autonomous Republic of Crimea, Ukrainian SSR, Soviet Union) is a retired Ukrainian football midfielder, who also holds Russian citizenship.

External links
 Profile on Official Website
 
 

1975 births
Living people
People from Kerch
Ukrainian footballers
Ukraine international footballers
FC Okean Kerch players
FC Spartak Sumy players
FC Kuban Krasnodar players
FC Naftovyk-Ukrnafta Okhtyrka players
FC Shinnik Yaroslavl players
FC Chernomorets Novorossiysk players
SC Tavriya Simferopol players
FC Volyn Lutsk players
PFC Sumy players
Ukrainian expatriate footballers
Expatriate footballers in Russia
Ukrainian expatriate sportspeople in Russia
Ukrainian Premier League players
Ukrainian First League players
Ukrainian Second League players
Russian Premier League players
Association football midfielders